During the 1990–91 English football season, Luton Town F.C. competed in the Football League First Division. They finished the season in 18th place, but avoided relegation due to an expansion of the First Division from 20 to 22 clubs for the following season, securing Luton a 10th successive season of First Division football. Manager Jimmy Ryan was dismissed shortly afterwards to make way for the returning David Pleat, who had previously been in charge from 1978 to 1986.

Squad

Results

First Division

Results

First Division

FA Cup

League Cup

Full Members' Cup

See also
 List of Luton Town F.C. seasons
 1990–91 Football League
 1990–91 FA Cup

References

Luton Town F.C. seasons
Luton Town